New Hope Club is the self-titled debut studio album by British pop trio New Hope Club, released on 14 February 2020, by Hollywood, Virgin and Universal Records. The album features guest appearances from Mexican singer Danna Paola and Dutch-Moroccan DJ R3hab. Commercially, the album peaked at number 5 on the UK albums chart and number 7 on the Irish albums chart.

Background 
After the album wasn't released in August, on 24 September 2019, the band announced on their social media that their album, still untitled would be released in February 2020. On 18 December 2019, the band officially announced the title and release date for the album.

Singles 
"Permission" was released as the album's lead single on 1 February 2019.

"Love Again" was released as the album's second single on 3 May 2019. The song's music video was released on 16 May 2019 and features American actress Bailee Madison.

"Know Me Too Well" with Mexican singer Danna Paola was released as the album's third single on 4 October 2019. The song's music video was shot in Valencia, Spain.

"Let Me Down Slow" with Dutch-Moroccan DJ R3hab was released as the album's fourth single on 17 January 2020. The song impacted contemporary hit radio in the United States on 25 February 2020. The song's acoustic version was released on 28 February 2020.

Other songs 
The songs "Crazy", "Medicine", "Karma" and the original version of "Let Me Down Slow" appear on the album after previously being released on the trio's second EP Welcome to the Club Pt. 2 (2018).

Track listing

Notes 
  signifies a vocal producer
  signifies a co-producer

Charts

Release history

Tours 
Due to the COVID-19 pandemic the band had to postpone their 2020 tour in support of the album to April 2021. In replacement they are doing a virtual world tour of different countries streaming for free on YouTube.

New Hope Club Virtual World Tour

April 2021/UK & Ireland Tour

References 

2020 debut albums
New Hope Club albums
Albums produced by Mac & Phil